Fleet captain is a historic military title that was bestowed upon a naval officer who served as chief of staff to a flag officer.

Historical background

In the Royal Navy, during the 18th and 19th centuries, an admiral's flagship might have a "captain of the fleet", who would be ranked between the admiral and the ship's captain (or "flag captain"). The "captain of the fleet" would be listed as the ship's "first captain" and would serve as the admiral's chief-of staff. The "flag captain" would be listed as the ship's "second captain" and retain actual command of the vessel.

The United States Navy had a similar position in the 19th century, but used the title "fleet captain" instead of "captain of the fleet." The fleet captain was not always actually a captain in rank, for instance Henry H. Bell was a commander when he served as David G. Farragut's fleet captain in the Civil War. In 1869 the Secretary of the Navy ordered that the title of fleet captain be changed to "chief of staff."

Science fiction
Fleet captain has appeared in several science fiction sources, the most notable of which is Star Trek. As a Starfleet officer rank, there have only been two fleet captains shown in the entirety of Star Trek, both from Star Trek: The Original Series: Garth of Izar and Christopher Pike. It seems to be used as an honorary rank for achievement or valor rather than a higher command rank.

The Imperial Navy of Star Wars maintains an equivalent senior captain rank of line captain, or captain of the line. Line captains command either a line of battle made up of several smaller ships or a lone, larger ship.

The fictional Royal Manticoran Navy of the Honor Harrington series maintains an equivalent rank of "Captain of the List." Captains of the List are typically given more prestigious commands than Captains not yet on the List, such as battlecruisers and superdreadnoughts, and are considered sufficiently "safe" in career terms that their promotion to flag rank is seen as an eventuality of accumulating sufficient seniority. This is equivalent to the Age of Sail Royal Navy term post-captain. Captains of the List use a different style of rank pip than Captains: The lesser title shares the four diamond rank pips with the lower rank of Commander (being distinct from a Commander in having four rank rings at their cuffs instead of three), while the greater has a distinctive disc-shaped rank insignia.

See also
 Senior colonel
 Senior captain

References

Naval ranks
Military appointments